Risotto (from  meaning "rice") is a northern Italian rice dish cooked with broth until it reaches a creamy consistency. The broth can be derived from meat, fish, or vegetables. Many types of risotto contain butter, onion, white wine, and Parmigiano-Reggiano. It is one of the most common ways of cooking rice in Italy. Saffron was originally used for flavour and its signature yellow colour.

Risotto in Italy is often a first course served before the main course, but risotto alla milanese is often served with ossobuco alla milanese as a main course.

History

Rice has been grown in southern Italy since at least the 14th century. From the south, rice gradually made its way north toward northern Italy, where the marshes of the Po river valley were suitable for rice cultivation. According to a legend, a young glassblower's apprentice of the Fabbrica del Duomo di Milano from Flanders, who used to use saffron as a pigment, added it to a rice dish at a wedding feast. The first recipe identifiable as risotto dates from 1809. It includes rice sautéed in butter, sausages, bone marrow, and onions with broth with saffron gradually added. There is a recipe for a dish named as a risotto in the 1854 Trattato di cucina ('Treatise on Cooking') by Giovanni Vialardi, assistant chief chef to kings. However, the question of who invented the risotto in Milan remains unanswered today.

The rice varieties now associated with risotto were developed in the 20th century, starting with Maratelli in 1914.

Rice varieties

A high-starch (amylopectin), low-amylose round medium- or short- grain white rice is usually used for making risotto. Such rices can absorb liquids and release starch, so they are stickier than the long grain varieties. The principal varieties used in Italy are Arborio, Baldo, Carnaroli, Maratelli, Padano, Roma, and Vialone Nano. Carnaroli, Maratelli (historical Italian variety) and Vialone Nano are considered to be the best (and most expensive) varieties, with different users preferring one over another. They have slightly different properties. For example, Carnaroli is less likely than Vialone Nano to get overcooked, but the latter, being smaller, cooks faster and absorbs condiments better. Other varieties such as Baldo, Originario, Ribe and Roma may be used but will not have the creaminess of the traditional dish; these varieties are considered better for soups and other non-risotto rice dishes and sweet rice desserts. Rice designations of superfino, semifino, and fino refer to the grains' size and shape (specifically the length and the narrowness) and not the quality.

Basic preparation
There are many different risotto recipes with different ingredients, but they are all based on rice of an appropriate variety, cooked in a standard procedure. Risotto, unlike other rice dishes, requires constant care and attention. The rice is not to be pre-rinsed, boiled, or drained, as washing would remove much of the starch required for a creamy texture.

The rice is first cooked briefly in a soffritto of onion and butter or olive oil to coat each grain in a film of fat, called tostatura; white wine is added and must be absorbed by the grains. When it has been absorbed, the heat is raised to medium-high, and boiling stock is gradually added in small amounts while stirring constantly. The constant stirring, with only a small amount of liquid present, forces the grains to rub against each other and release the starch from the outside of the grains into the surrounding liquid, creating a smooth creamy-textured mass. When the rice is cooked the pot is taken off the heat for mantecatura, vigorously beating in refrigerated balls of grated parmesan cheese and butter, to make the texture as creamy and smooth as possible. It may be removed from the heat a few minutes earlier and left to cook with its residual heat.

Properly cooked risotto is rich and creamy even if no cream is added due to the starch in the grains. It has some resistance or bite (al dente) and separate grains. The traditional texture is fairly fluid, or all'onda ("wavy" or "flowing in waves"). It is served on flat dishes and should easily spread out but not have excess watery liquid around the perimeter. It must be eaten at once, as it continues to cook in its own heat, making the grains absorb all the liquid and become soft and dry.

Italian regional variations
Many variations have their own names:

See also

 Congee
 Paella
 Pilaf
 List of Italian dishes
 List of rice dishes

References

Further reading

 Barrett, Judith, and Wasserman, Norma (1987). Risotto. New York: Scribner. .
 Hazan, Marcella (1992). Essentials of Classic Italian Cooking. New York: Alfred A. Knopf. .

Italian rice dishes
Swiss cuisine
National dishes